Run, Rose, Run is the forty-eighth solo studio album by American singer-songwriter Dolly Parton. It was released March 4, 2022, through Parton's own Butterfly Records. The album was produced by Parton with Richard Dennison and Tom Rutledge. It is a companion album to the novel of the same name, co-written by Parton and James Patterson. The album was preceded by the release of the singles "Big Dreams and Faded Jeans" and "Blue Bonnet Breeze". On March 21, 2022, it was announced that Parton would star in and produce a film adaptation of the novel from Reese Witherspoon's Hello Sunshine.

Background
Parton prematurely announced that she was working on a novel with James Patterson in July 2020, during an interview with Eddie Stubbs on WSM. Following the broadcast, the interview was posted to WSM's SoundCloud page, but was deleted by mid-afternoon the next day. She first mentioned that she was working on a new bluegrass album in June 2021 during a press conference at Dollywood announcing their new Heartsong Lodge & Resort. Parton teased the album again in July 2021 during an interview with Tim McGraw on his Apple Music radio show Beyond the Influence. She mentioned that she had recorded duets with Merle Haggard’s son (though she did not specify whether it was Marty, Noel, or Ben) and Joe Nichols (who she previously collaborated with on "If I Were a Carpenter" for her 2005 album Those Were the Days). She went on to say that she had recorded some bluegrass and some country material for the record.

Release and promotion
On Wednesday, August 11, 2021, Parton officially announced that she had teamed up with James Patterson to write a new book titled Run, Rose, Run, to be published on March 7, 2022, by Little, Brown and Company. She also announced that the book would be released alongside an album of 12 original songs produced by Richard Dennison and Tom Rutledge. The album was released March 4, 2022, on CD, digital download, and LP. Parton's online store offered an exclusive marble red LP, while Barnes & Noble, Target, Walmart, and Talk Shop Live offered opaque blue, clear green, peach, and violet LPs, respectively. Target stores also offered a CD edition containing an exclusive bookmark. Jeni's Splendid Ice Creams offered an exclusive digital version of the album containing one bonus track, "Rose of My Heart" (which was originally released in March 2009 as a bonus track on the Collector's Edition of Parton's 2008 album Backwoods Barbie sold at Cracker Barrel).

Singles
The album's first single, "Big Dreams and Faded Jeans", was released on January 14, 2022. "Blue Bonnet Breeze" was released as the second single on February 11. "Woman Up (And Take It Like a Man)" was issued as the third single alongside the album's release on March 4.

Critical reception

Run, Rose, Run was met with favorable reviews from music critics. At Metacritic, which assigns a normalized rating out of 100 to reviews from professional publications, the album received an average score of 68, based on  six reviews, indicating "generally favorable reviews".

Writing for The Times, Will Hodgkinson described the album as "bluegrass-tinged country with the energy of rock and the emotion of MOR balladry." He noted that while "there are no surprises" on the album, it demonstrates "Parton's remarkable ability to write songs that hide their sophistication underneath language and themes anyone can understand and relate to." In a positive review for the Evening Standard, David Smyth said this may seem "more like a money-printing marketing exercise than any deep-rooted desire to produce a great American novel," but "the album itself is significantly more straightforward than all the elements around it." He felt that the songs are "good enough to deserve more than status as footnotes to a book." Helen Brown gave a positive review for The Independent, saying that the album will leave listeners "marveling at Parton's ability to capitalize on her slick professionalism without ever compromising her huge heart and sparkling spirit." Emma Harrison at Clash described the album as "effervescent, exuberant, wry, but always appealing." She said the album "displays Dolly's evergreen storytelling prowess and is a vibrant and compelling body of work." Further describing the album as "uplifting and vulnerable," she said that it "effortlessly accompanies the story that unfolds in her novel. However, it is strong enough to work as a standalone body of work." Stephen Thomas Erlewine of AllMusic also reviewed the album positively. He theorized that Parton might be "cloaking her personal experiences in the guise of a fictional narrative...to allude to her past in this fashion." He went on to say that "no matter the inspiration" the album is "a satisfying listen on its own terms."

In a mixed review for The Arts Desk, Tim Cumming described the album as "a hot mix of bluegrass and acoustic, down-home country." Nick Levine of NME also gave a mixed review of the album. He called the album "a thoroughly enjoyable listen that confirms what fans already know: even a middle-of-the-road Dolly Parton album has lashings of charm." In a mixed review for Rolling Stone, Jonathan Bernstein said "Run, Rose, Run is an impressive display of Parton's songwriting and vocal mastery that nevertheless leaves one hoping she one day releases the classic late-era record she's so clearly primed to make, should she choose." Andy Fyfe of Mojo gave the album a mixed review, rating it three out of five stars. He felt that "while some of her peers are making late-life albums that push both them and their audience, it's a pity Parton has retreated into much safer and predictable territory."

Commercial performance
Run, Rose, Run debuted and peaked at number 34 on Billboard 200 with 17,000 equivalent album units sold in its first week. The album also debuted and peaked at number four on the Billboard Top Country Albums chart. It is Parton's forty-seventh top ten entry on the chart, extending her record for the most top tens by a female artist. The album also peaked at number one on the Billboard Top Americana/Folk Albums chart and the Billboard Bluegrass Albums chart. It peaked at number six on the Billboard Independent Albums chart. In Europe the album peaked at number 23 on the UK Albums chart, number one on the UK Country Albums chart, number four on the UK Independent Albums chart, number four on the Scottish Albums chart, number 76 on the Dutch Albums chart, and number 122 on the Belgium Albums chart. It also peaked at number six on the Australian Country Albums chart.

Track listing

Personnel
Adapted from the album liner notes.

Performance

David Angell – violin (6, 12)
Monissa Angel – violin (6)
Appalachian Road Show – background vocals (10)
Barry Abernathy, Jim Van Cleve, Darrel Webb
Pat Bergeson – harmonica (2, 7)
Becky Isaacs Bowman – background vocals (4)
Jamie Dailey – background vocals (1)
David Davidson – violin (6, 12)
Richard Dennison – piano (1, 4, 8, 11, 12), B3 organ (2, 7), keys (3, 9), guest artist (12), background vocals (2, 3, 5, 7, 9, 10)
Ben Haggard – guest artist (3)
Vicki Hampton – background vocals (2, 3, 5, 7, 9, 10)
Steve Hinson – steel guitar (10)
Paul Hollowell – B3 organ (5)
Sonya Isaacs – background vocals (4)
Dirk Johnson – keys (10)
Steve Mackey – bass (1–5, 7, 8–11)
Jimmy Mattingly – fiddle (1, 8, 11), mandolin (6, 9, 12)
Charlie McCoy – harmonica (3)
Aaron McCune – background vocals (1)
Joe Nichols – guest artist (10)
Jennifer O'Brien – background vocals (2, 3, 5, 7, 9, 10)
Richie Owens – Weissenborn resonator guitar (5)
Carole Rabinowitz – cello (6)
Sarighani Reist – cello (12)
Dolly Parton – lead vocals, harmony vocals (3, 6, 8–10)
Tom Rutledge – banjo (1, 4, 11), acoustic guitar (3, 5–7, 9, 10)
Val Storey – background vocals (8)
Scott Vestal – banjo (8)
Darrin Vincent – background vocals (1)
Rhonda Vincent – background vocals (8)
Kent Wells – acoustic guitar (1, 2, 4, 8, 11), electric guitar (1–5, 7–11)
Kristin Wilkinson – viola (12)
Lonnie Wilson – drums (1–5, 7–11)

Production

Daniel Bacigalupi – Dolby Atmos mastering assistant, vinyl mastering assistant (Infrasonic Mastering, Nashville, Tennessee)
Mark Capps – mixing (Sound Shop East, Nashville, Tennessee)
Joe Corey – recording engineer (The Sound House, Redding, California)
Joey Crawford – recording engineer (Adventure Studio, Nashville, Tennessee)
David Davidson – string arrangement (tracks 6, 12)
Richard Dennison – producer, co-producer, vocal arrangements
Ben Isaacs – recording engineer, edit engineer (Ben's Den Recording Studio, Hendersonville, Tennessee)
Chris Latham – edit engineer (The Gorilla's Nest, Joelton, Tennessee)
Pete Lyman – Dolby Atmos mastering (Infrasonic Mastering, Nashville, Tennessee)
Andrew Mendelson – mastering (Georgetown Masters, Nashville, Tennessee)
Mark Needham – Dolby Atmos mixing (In the Woods Studio)
Dolly Parton – producer, executive producer
Piper Payne – vinyl mastering (Infrasonic Mastering, Nashville, Tennessee)
Tom Rutledge – producer, co-producer, recording engineer, edit engineer (Velvet Apple Studios, Nashville, Tennessee)
Phillip Smith – Dolby ATMOS mixing assistant (In the Woods Studio)
Darrin Vincent – recording engineer (Dailey and Vincent, Nashville, Tennessee)
Kent Wells – recording engineer (KWP Productions, Nashville, Tennessee)
Lonnie Wilson – recording engineer (The Freeway, Franklin, Tennessee)

Other personnel
Stacie Huckeba – photographer
Iisha Lemming – wardrobe production
Vance Nichols – wardrobe production
Riley Reed – wardrobe production
Cheryl Riddle – hair
J.B. Rowland – art direction
Rebecca Seaver – creative production manager
Steve Summers – costume designer

Charts

Weekly charts

Year-end charts

References

2022 albums
Dolly Parton albums